Jack Bondon (born August 6, 1981) is an American politician who served as a member of the Missouri House of Representatives for the 56th district from 2015 to 2021.

Early life and education 
Born in Kansas City, Missouri, Bondon attended Rockhurst High School. He is a 2004 graduate of Georgetown University.

Career 
During his tenure in the House, Bondon served as chief deputy whip of the Republican caucus and as chairman of the House Financial Institutions Committee. He also served as a member of the Emerging Issues in Education Committee, the Energy and the Environment Committee, the Utilities Committee, the Emerging Issues–General Laws Committee, the Banking Committee, the Rules- House Consent and Procedure Committee, and the Rules Committee.

References

1981 births
Living people
Republican Party members of the Missouri House of Representatives
McDonough School of Business alumni
21st-century American politicians